Sir William Maynard, 4th Baronet (19 April 1721 – 18 January 1772) of Waltons, Ashdon, Essex was a British politician and baronet.

He was the only son of Sir Henry Maynard, 3rd Baronet and his wife Catherine Gunter, daughter of George Gunter. In 1738, he succeeded his father as baronet. Maynard entered the British House of Commons as Member of Parliament (MP) for Essex in 1759, representing the constituency until 1772.

On 13 August 1751, he married Charlotte Bisshopp, second daughter of Sir Cecil Bishopp, 6th Baronet, and by her he had four children, three sons and one daughter. His oldest son Charles succeeded to the baronetcy, and by a special remainder also succeeded his kinsman Charles Maynard, 1st Viscount Maynard as 2nd Viscount Maynard in 1775.

References

1721 births
1772 deaths
Baronets in the Baronetage of England
British MPs 1754–1761
British MPs 1761–1768
British MPs 1768–1774
Members of the Parliament of Great Britain for English constituencies